Antonio Bielsa Alegre (1929–2008) was an Aragonese archaeologist born in Calanda in the Spanish comarca of Bajo Aragón.

Excavations

1964: Roman villa of Camino de Albalate

References
 La Vanguardia, 28 February 1964 (Spanish)
 Kolenda, August 2011 (Spanish)
 El Periódico de Aragón, 22 September 2017 (Spanish)
 lacomarca.net, 16 October 2017 (Spanish)
D. Antonio Bielsa Alegre, en Un hito de la arqueología aragonesa CTC Aragón, 19 January 2019 (Spanish)

Bibliography
 García Miralles, Manuel, Historia de Calanda, Tipografía Artística Puertes, Valencia, 1969, pp. 13-14.
 Sanz Martínez, Manuel, Calanda. De la Edad de Piedra al siglo XX, Imprenta Artis-Graf, Reus, 1970, pp. 17-20.
 Severino, B.: "Una joya del subsuelo calandino", en La Comarca (Periódico independiente del Bajo Aragón Histórico), nº 2154 (6 de octubre de 2017), p. 10.

1929 births
2008 deaths
People from Calanda
20th-century Spanish archaeologists